The 2013–14 Polish Cup was the sixtieth season of the annual Polish football knockout tournament. It began on 13 July 2013 with the first matches of the extra preliminary round and ended on 2 May 2014 with the Final. The winners qualified for the second qualifying round of the 2014–15 UEFA Europa League. 

Legia Warsaw were the defending champions, having won their record breaking 16th title in the previous season. Zawisza Bydgoszcz won the match 6–5 on penalties following a 0–0 draw after extra time, thus winning the first Polish Cup trophy in the club's history.

Participating teams

Notes:
 The top seeds can't meet prior to the semi-finals.
 The winners of the Lesser Poland regional Cup were disqualified from 2013–14 Polish Cup, as the Lesser Poland FA were unable to determine the winner within the time limit set by the 2013–14 Polish Cup rulebook.

Round and draw dates

Extra preliminary round
The draw for this round was conducted at the headquarters of the Polish FA on 14 June 2013. Participating in this round are 16 regional cup winners and 36 teams from the 2012–13 II Liga. The matches will be played on 13 July 2013.

! colspan="3" style="background:cornsilk;"|9 July 2013

|-
! colspan="3" style="background:cornsilk;"|13 July 2013

|-
! colspan="3" style="background:cornsilk;"|14 July 2013

|}
Notes
Note 1: KS Tymbark were disqualified from the competition.
Note 2: Radomiak, Resovia, Tur and Unia Tarnów withdrew from the competition.

Preliminary round
The draw for this round was conducted at the headquarters of the Polish FA on 14 June 2013. The matches were played on 17 July 2013. Gryf Wejherowo and Zagłębie Sosnowiec received a bye to the First Round.

! colspan="3" style="background:cornsilk;"|17 July 2013

|}
Notes
Note 1: Played at Stadion Miejski, Tarnobrzeg, as Garbarnia's home stadium did not meet the PZPN criteria.

First round
The draw for this round was conducted at the headquarters of the Polish FA on 24 June 2013. Participating in this round are the 12 winners of the preliminary round along with Gryf Wejherowo and Zagłębie Sosnowiec and the 18 teams from 2012–13 I Liga (Poland). The matches will be played on 23 and 24 July 2013.

! colspan="3" style="background:cornsilk;"|23 July 2013

|-
! colspan="3" style="background:cornsilk;"|24 July 2013

|}
Notes
Note 1: ŁKS Łódź withdrew from the competition.

Bracket

Round of 32 
The draw for this round was conducted at Stadion Wojska Polskiego, Warsaw on 25 July 2013. Participating in this round are the 16 winners of the first round along with the 16 teams from 2012–13 Ekstraklasa. The matches were played on 16 and 17 August 2013.

! colspan="3" style="background:cornsilk;"|16 August 2013

|-
! colspan="3" style="background:cornsilk;"|17 August 2013

|-
! colspan="3" style="background:cornsilk;"|18 August 2013

|}

Round of 16 
Competing in this round are the 16 winners from the previous round. Matches were played on 16, 21, 22 & 23 October 2013, 5, 6 & 7 November 2013 & 18 December 2013. Numbers in brackets associate what tier of Polish football the club compete in. Katowice, Tychy, Arka Gdynia, Miedź Legnica & Sandecja Nowy Sącz are the five lowest ranked teams left in the competition, all competing in the second tier of Polish football.

! colspan="3" style="background:cornsilk;"|16 October 2013

|-
! colspan="3" style="background:cornsilk;"|21 October 2013

|-
! colspan="3" style="background:cornsilk;"|22 October 2013

|-
! colspan="3" style="background:cornsilk;"|23 October 2013

|-
! colspan="3" style="background:cornsilk;"|5 November 2013

|-
! colspan="3" style="background:cornsilk;"|6 November 2013

|-
! colspan="3" style="background:cornsilk;"|7 November 2013

|-
! colspan="3" style="background:cornsilk;"|18 December 2013

|}

Quarter-finals
The 8 winners from Round of 16 competed in this round.The matches will be played in two legs. The first leg took place on 11, 12 and 19 March 2014, while the second legs were played on 25 and 26 March 2014.Pairs were determined on 25 July 2013.

|}

First leg

Second leg

Semi-finals
The 4 winners from the quarterfinals competed in this round.The matches will be played in two legs. The first leg took place on 8 & 9 April 2014, while the second legs were played on 16 April 2014.Pairs were determined on 25 July 2013.

|}

First leg

Second leg

Final

See also
 2013–14 Ekstraklasa

References

Polish Cup
Cup
Polish Cup seasons